Brandon Michael Green (born July 23, 1988), better known by his stage name Maejor (formerly Bei Maejor and later Maejor Ali), is an American record producer, rapper, singer, and songwriter from Detroit, Michigan. Green has written and produced songs for several prominent artists in the music industry—most extensively Justin Bieber—and is half of the EDM duo Area21, alongside Dutch DJ Martin Garrix.

In 2013, Green was briefly signed to Def Jam Recordings, and released the breakout single as a solo artist, "Lolly" (featuring Juicy J and longtime collaborator Justin Bieber). The song peaked at number 19 on the Billboard Hot 100. As well as producing music for national campaigns including Pepsi and the Boston Celtics, Maejor has also scored film soundtracks for Bratz: The Movie (2007), The Princess and the Frog (2009) and Think Like a Man (2012).
He also has produced music for video games including NBA 2K and FIFA.

Life and career 
Maejor was born Brandon Green on July 23, 1988. He graduated from the University of Michigan, Ann Arbor in 2008. Immediately after graduation, he moved to Atlanta and joined Ne-Yo's production team Compound Entertainment. Maejor released his first mixtape Upside Down, which features appearances from Keri Hilson, Trey Songz, Drake and T-Pain. He also lent his vocal and production skills on the official remix of Ciara's "Ride", with André 3000 and Ludacris.

Maejor received his first gold plaque for his production on Bun B's 2005 album Trill, while still attending the University of Michigan in Ann Arbor. In 2010, Maejor was nominated for a Grammy Award, for his work on Trey Songz's album Passion, Pain & Pleasure, and again in 2011, for Monica's album Still Standing. In 2012, Maejor produced two songs on Justin Bieber's album Believe as well as the single "Say Somethin" by Austin Mahone. Maejor's single "Lights Down Low" was used as the official soundtrack in the NBA Playoffs for the Boston Celtics. He also produced the national campaign commercial for Pepsi in 2010 and 2013. He teamed with Justin Bieber again in 2013, co-producing his single "Heartbreaker". In 2013, Maejor also released a single titled "Lolly", featuring Juicy J. "Lolly" which peaked at number 19 on the US Billboard Hot 100 chart. He continues to produce and write for the top artists in the industry including three songs and Grammy nominations on Justin Bieber's number-one album Purpose.

In 2017 Maejor co-wrote and performed in Vai Malandra which was officially released worldwide to online retailers and streaming services on December 18, 2017. "Vai Malandra" received more than 1 million plays on Spotify on its first day of release and broke the record for the most streams received in a day in Brazil – held previously by Taylor Swift's "Look What You Made Me Do". On its second day of release, the song was played more than 2 million times, surpassing the record for the most streamed song in a day in Brazil. Due to the amount of streams received on its first days of release, the song debuted on the Global Top 50 chart in Spotify and became the first song in Portuguese to hit the Top 20 on that chart on December 20, 2017.

Discography 

 Vol 1: Frequency (2020)

Filmography

Film

Television 
 Jersey Shore (2011)
"The Tequila Song" aired in the season finale on March 24, 2011. Written and sung by Janine the Machine.

References

External links 
 

Living people
1988 births
People from Southfield, Michigan
African-American male singer-songwriters
American rhythm and blues singer-songwriters
American male pop singers
American hip hop singers
African-American record producers
American hip hop record producers
Midwest hip hop musicians
University of Michigan alumni
Singers from Detroit
21st-century African-American male singers
Singer-songwriters from Michigan